The 2010–11 Serie A season was the 77th season of the Serie A, the top level of ice hockey in Italy. Nine teams participated in the league, and Asiago Hockey won the championship by defeating HC Pustertal in the final.

Regular season

Playoffs

External links
 Season on hockeyarchives.info  

Serie A
Serie A (ice hockey) seasons
Ita